Daniel Florence Cohalan (December 21, 1865, Middletown, Orange County, New York – November 12, 1946, New York City) was an Irish American lawyer and politician.

Life
He was the son of Timothy E. Cohalan and Ellen (O'Leary) Cohalan. He graduated from Manhattan College in 1885. Then he studied law, was admitted to the bar in 1888, and practiced in Orange County. In September 1889, he removed to the Bronx, practiced law there, and entered politics, joining Tammany Hall. He was Grand Sachem of the Tammany Society from 1908 to 1911.

On May 18, 1911, he was appointed by Gov. John Alden Dix to the New York Supreme Court, to fill the vacancy caused by the election of James Aloysius O'Gorman as U.S. Senator from New York. In November 1911, Cohalan was elected to succeed himself. On December 28, 1923, he tendered his resignation, to become effective on January 12, 1924, claiming that the annual salary of $17,500 was not enough to provide for his large family.

He was a close associate of Irish revolutionary leader John Devoy and was influential in many Irish-American societies including Clan na Gael. Cohalan was involved with the financing and planning of the Easter Rising in Dublin and was instrumental in sending Roger Casement to Germany in 1914. He was Chairman of the Irish Race Convention held in Philadelphia (22–23 February 1919) and active in the Friends of Irish Freedom (1916–1934).

Cohalan strongly opposed President Woodrow Wilson's proposals for the League of Nations, on the basis that the Irish Republic had been denied a policy of self-determination at the Paris Peace Conference in 1919. Cohalan broke with both Éamon de Valera and Irish-American leader Joseph McGarrity in late 1919 on Irish-American political direction.

He died at his New York City home on November 12, 1946, and was buried at the Calvary Cemetery in Queens.

State Senator John P. Cohalan (1873–1950) was one of his eleven siblings, and church historian Monsignor Florence Daniel Cohalan (1908–2001) was one of his nine children.

References
 D.J.Hickey & J.E.Doherty. A Dictionary of Irish History. Gill & MacMillan. Ireland 1980. p81 
 DIX NAMES COHALAN FOR SUPREME COURT in NYT on May 19, 1911
 COHALAN RESIGNS, SALARY TOO SMALL in NYT on December 29, 1923 (subscription required)
 DANIEL F. COHALAN, EX-JUSTICE, 81, DIES in NYT on November 13, 1946 (subscription required) [The age given "81" is contradicted by printed sources from the 1930s which state December 21, 1867, as birth date.]

1867 births
1946 deaths
People from Middletown, Orange County, New York
Manhattan College alumni
New York Supreme Court Justices
People from the Bronx
Burials at Calvary Cemetery (Queens)